Labanda semipars is a moth in the family Nolidae first described by Francis Walker in 1858. It is found in Sri Lanka.

The larval host plants are species of the genus Diospyros.

References

Moths of Asia
Moths described in 1858
Chloephorinae